Alex Hanna (born 1964) is an English artist. He studied Fine Art at Sunderland Polytechnic from 1983 to 1986. His paintings display arrangements of disposable packaging and objects which have little or no material value. These objects are arranged in a traditional still life format and painted using process based and traditional painting techniques.

Hanna has exhibited at the National Portrait Gallery, London, Glasgow School of Art and the Royal Academy of Arts. His paintings have been acquired by Abbot Hall Art Gallery, Falmouth Art Gallery, Swindon Art Gallery, The Priseman Seabrook Collection, Rugby Art Gallery and Museum and the University of Arizona Museum of Art.

Selected exhibitions 
 “Perceptions of the Mundane” The Crypt, St Marylebone Parish Church, London (2015)
 “Documentary Realism: Painting in the Digital Age” The Crypt, St Marylebone Parish Church, London (2015)
 “Lynn Painter-Stainers Prize” The Mall Galleries, London (2015)
 “Ambiguous Practices” Aberystwyth University (2015) 
 “The Brentwood Stations of the Cross” Brentwood Cathedral (2014)
 “@Paintbritain” Ipswich Museum (2014)
 “Contemporary British Painting” Huddersfield Art Gallery (2014)
 “Contemporary British Painting” The Crypt, St Marylebone Parish Church, London (2013)
 “Threadneedle Prize” Mall Galleries, London (2013)
 “Royal Academy Summer Exhibition” Royal Academy of Arts, London (2013)
 “Artist in Action for Education” Mok Space Gallery, London (2013)
 “Marmite Painting Prize for Painting” Mackintosh Museum, Glasgow School of Art (2013)
 “Salon Art Prize”, John Jones, London (2012)
 “ BP Portrait Award” National Portrait Gallery, London (2012)

Selected collections 
Abbot Hall Art Gallery
Falmouth Art Gallery
Swindon Art Gallery
The Priseman Seabrook Collection
Rugby Art Gallery and Museum
University of Arizona Museum of Art

References

External links
Alex Hanna website

21st-century British painters
British male painters
Living people
Alumni of the University of Sunderland
People from Birkenhead
1964 births
21st-century British male artists